Granville station (French: Gare de Granville) is a railway station serving the commune of Granville, in the Manche department of northwestern France.

Train services
Train service (2022) is to/from Paris Gare Montparnasse via Argentan, to/from Rennes and to/from Caen.

References

External links
 

Railway stations in Manche
Railway stations in France opened in 1870